Stefan Doernberg (21 June 1924 – 3 May 2010) was a writer, secondary school teacher and Researcher of Contemporary History as well as the final director of International Relations Institute for the Academy of the State and Jurisprudence (ASR in German) for the German Democratic Republic (East Germany). He was the East German ambassador to Finland from 1981 to 1987.

Early life
Doernberg was born the son of an official of the KPD. In 1935, he and his parents emigrated to the Soviet Union where he attended the Karl Liebknecht School. In 1939, he joined the KJVD and received his Abitur in Moscow.

On the day of Operation Barbarossa, he joined the Red Army. He was temporarily interned in a work camp in the Urals because of his German origins but he returned from his stay there to the front after schooling in the Comintern. As a Lieutenant in the 8th Guards Army he participated in the battles in the Ukraine, Poland, and Berlin.

References

1924 births
2010 deaths
Writers from Berlin
Socialist Unity Party of Germany politicians
The Left (Germany) politicians
21st-century German politicians
Ambassadors of East Germany to Finland
Soviet military personnel of World War II
Recipients of the Patriotic Order of Merit
Refugees from Nazi Germany in the Soviet Union
German male writers